The BMW M54 is a naturally aspirated straight-6 petrol engine produced from 2000 to 2006. It was released in the E53 X5 and is the replacement for the M52 engine. The S54 is the equivalent high performance engine, used in the E46 M3, the Z3 M Coupé/Roadster and the E85/E86 Z4 M. The BMW M56 SULEV engine (sold in several states of the United States) is based on the M54.

The M54 was phased out following the introduction of the BMW N52 engine in 2004. From 2001 to 2003, the M54 was included on the Ward's 10 Best Engines list.

Design 
Compared with the final versions of its M52 predecessor (called the 'M52TU'), the M54 has a non-return fuel system, a fully electronic throttle (without mechanical backup), Siemens MS 43 engine management, a revised intake manifold.

As per the M52TU, the M54 uses an aluminium block and aluminium cylinder head with cast iron cylinder liners. Variable valve timing is fitted to both camshafts (called "double-VANOS"), a dual length intake manifold (called "DISA") is used and the thermostat is electronically controlled. The redline remains at 6,500 rpm.

There was no "technical update" (TU) version of the M54 produced, therefore the engine specifications remained the same throughout its seven-year production run.

Versions

M54B22

Applications
 2000–2006 E46 320i, 320Ci
 2000–2003 E39 520i
 2000–2002 E36/7 Z3 2.2i
 2003–2005 E85 Z4 2.2i
 2003–2005 E60/E61 520i

M54B25

Applications
 2000–2002 E36/7 Z3 2.5i
 2000–2006 E46 325i, 325xi, 325Ci
 2000–2004 E46/5 325ti
 2000–2004 E39 525i
 2003–2005 E60/E61 525i, 525xi
 2003–2006 E83 X3 2.5i
 2002–2005 E85 Z4 2.5i

M54B30

The M54B30 was on the Ward's 10 Best Engines list through 2001–2003.

Applications
 2000–2006 E46 330i, 330xi, 330Ci
 2000–2004 E39 530i
 2000–2002 E36/7 Z3 3.0i
 2003–2005 E60 530i
 2002–2005 E85 Z4 3.0i
 2003–2006 E83 X3 3.0i
 2000–2006 E53 X5 3.0i
 2002–2005 E65/E66 730i, 730Li
 2000–2002 Wiesmann MF 30

S54

The S54 was marketed as the high performance equivalent to the M54, however it is actually more an evolution of the BMW S50 and shares few parts with the M54. As per the S50, the engine block is made of cast iron (unlike the aluminium engine block used by the M54). Redline is 8,000 rpm.

Compared with the S50, the S54 features:
 Revised camshafts
 Finger follower valve actuation instead of bucket-style tappets.
 Compression ratio increased from 11.3:1 to 11.5:1
 Siemens MSS 54 Engine control unit
 Electronic throttle control
 Scavenging oil pump (to avoid oil starvation during cornering; this was also present on the S50B30 of the E36 M3 GT and the S50B32, but not the regular S50B30)

There is no direct successor to the S54, since the following generation of M3 is powered by the BMW S65 V8 engine.

However, in 2014, the S65 V8 engine was replaced with an inline-6 engine called the BMW S55. This is considered the spiritual successor of the S54, being a 6-cylinder engine. This engine was first used in the newly introduced BMW M3 F80 and BMW M4 F82

S54B32
Variations in power and torque outputs are often due to country-specific emissions regulations, or space constraints of a chassis affecting the layout of the intake/exhaust system.

Applications
 2006–2008 E85 Z4 M Roadster, E86 Z4 M Coupé — produces  and  - Engine code 326S4.

S54B32HP

An upgraded version of the S54 engine was used in the E46 M3 CSL. This engine is designated S54B32HP and the changes include a revised intake made from carbon fiber, revised camshafts, a MAP sensor (instead of the MAF sensor used in the regular S54), a lightweight exhaust manifold with a straighter air path (which later became standard on the regular S54) and a straightened intake manifold.

Applications
 2003 E46 M3 CSL , 
 2009 Wiesmann MF 3 Roadster "20th Anniversary Edition" — produces ,

See also

 List of BMW engines

References

M54
Straight-six engines
Gasoline engines by model